Fabiola is a Venezuelan telenovela produced by Venevisión in 1989. An original story written by Delia Fiallo based on the radionovela Tu mundo y el mío, this version was adapted by Ana Mercedes Escamez and Milagros del Valle. The telenovela was distributed internationally by Venevisión International.

Alba Roversi and Guillermo Dávila starred as the main protagonists.

Synopsis 
Fabiola and her family suffer the disgrace of passing from a very wealthy life to that of total poverty, after her father's death. Doing translations and giving lessons at home, Fabiola achieves to support her grandmother Maria Manuela, her sister Marian and her brother Alberto. This is how, one day, she ends up at Carlos Alberto Roman's house, to give him, and his little sister, lessons. But, at the same time, she wins the friendship and acceptance of the whole family: father, mother, young daughter and specially, Carlos Alberto, who fall in love with her from the very beginning. But as a typical "playboy" he tries to take advantage of her, and discovers she is not that type of girl; so he decides to forget the whole thing for a while only to realize he is truly in love with her. He returns to Fabiola to ask her in marriage. This marriage will encounter several problems but a dramatic reconciliation will bring back the faith and happiness they deserve.

Cast
Alba Roversi as Fabiola
Guillermo Dávila as Carlos Alberto
Miguel de León as Alejandro Fuentes
Loly Sanchez as Veronica
Anabel Gracia as Marian
Vangie Labalan as Mariana Alberta
Laura Termini as Laurita

References

External links

Opening Credits

1989 telenovelas
1989 Venezuelan television series debuts
1989 Venezuelan television series endings
Venezuelan telenovelas
Venevisión telenovelas
Spanish-language telenovelas
Television shows set in Venezuela